New Hampshire Motor Speedway is a  oval speedway located in Loudon, New Hampshire, which has hosted NASCAR racing annually since 1990, as well as the longest-running motorcycle race in North America, the Loudon Classic. Nicknamed "The Magic Mile", the speedway is often converted into a  road course, which includes much of the oval.

The track was originally the site of Bryar Motorsports Park before being purchased and redeveloped by Bob Bahre. The track is currently one of eight major NASCAR tracks owned and operated by Speedway Motorsports.

History 

The track opened as New Hampshire International Speedway in June 1990, after nine months of construction following the Bahre family's purchase of the Bryar Motorsports Park. The existing road circuit was redeveloped into a multi-purpose track, with NASCAR-sanctioned races added to the popular Loudon Classic motorcycle, WKA go-kart and SCCA races on the complex. Upon completion it became the largest speedway in New England, and later expansion has made it the largest sports and entertainment venue of any type in the region. Its construction was extremely unusual for a race track, in that it was designed and constructed without consulting engineers, and using just one surveyor (whose primary job was to plant stakes) to help. NASCAR made its debut at the track in July 1990, with a Busch Series race won by Tommy Ellis. For three years, the Busch Series hosted a pair of races at the track each year.

The Busch races were successful. Loudon gained a spot on the NASCAR Cup Series schedule in 1993. Rusty Wallace won the inaugural Slick 50 300 in July of that year. That race was also Davey Allison's final race: the next day, Allison was fatally injured in a helicopter crash.

In 1996, Ernie Irvan captured the win in the Cup race, making it one of the more emotional victories in NASCAR history. The win came less than two years after Irvan suffered a near-fatal crash at Michigan International Speedway, where he was given less than a 10% chance of survival.

After the 1996 season Bahre and Bruton Smith bought North Wilkesboro Speedway and moved one of its Cup dates to New Hampshire. The second race was held in September. From 2004 to 2010, it was the site of the first event of the Chase for the Championship. In 2011, the date was shifted to the second race in the Chase, serving as one of three races in the Challenger Round, and remaining in the NASCAR Playoff rounds through 2017, after which the fall Cup date was eliminated.

The speedway was the first for NASCAR to start the field in two groups under the warm-up laps to help set pit speed.

The track also hosted open-wheel racing for seven years, hosting CART from 1992–1995, then the Indy Racing League from 1996–1998. One of the open wheel winners was Tony Stewart, who later won three NASCAR Cup Series races at the track as well.

In 2000, the track was the site of a pair of fatal collisions which took the lives of two promising young drivers. In May, while practicing for a Busch Series race, Adam Petty perished when his throttle stuck exiting the second turn, resulting in a full speed crash head-on in the middle of the third and fourth turns. When the NASCAR Cup Series made their first appearance of the season, a similar fate befell 1998 Rookie of the Year Kenny Irwin Jr. For safety reasons, track owners decided to run restrictor plates on the cars during their return trip to the speedway in September 2000. This resulted in an uneventful Dura Lube 300 won by Jeff Burton, which had no lead changes. It was the first wire-to-wire race since the 1970s.

The 2001 New Hampshire 300 was originally scheduled for September 16, the Sunday after the September 11 terrorist attacks. NASCAR initially announced that the race would be held as scheduled, but the event was postponed until November 23 of that year, which was the Friday after Thanksgiving. There was much concern about the weather, but race day turned out to be unseasonably mild. Robby Gordon won that race.

In 2002, in an effort to increase competitive racing, the track's corners were turned into a progressive banking system, as the apron was paved and became part of the track, and the track's banking was varied from 4 degrees in the lower two lanes to 12% grade (about seven degrees). The addition of SAFER barriers to the corner walls was made in 2003.

During the September 2003 SYLVANIA 300, an incident occurred at this track involving Dale Jarrett where his wrecked race car brought out a caution flag. At the time, NASCAR's policy was for its drivers to race back to the start-finish line to begin the caution period. This policy allowed drivers who were one or more laps down to pass the leader and get back one lap, but during the 2003 season there were several incidents which involved drivers racing back to the caution nearly causing collisions. Jarrett's car had stalled on the front stretch— in fact, directly in the path of oncoming cars— and he was in danger of being hit by cars that were trying to get laps back. Although Jarrett avoided contact, the incident was enough for NASCAR to act and beginning with the next race, NASCAR outlawed racing back to the caution flag and instead froze the field after a caution, and a "free pass" rule (popularly referred to as "the lucky dog") was put in place in which the first car behind the leader not on the lead lap would get their lap back during each caution period in all of NASCAR's national and regional series.

In mid-May 2006, Loudon was one of many New England communities which experienced damaging floods after a week of near-record rainfall. Several roads and bridges were washed out near the speedway. The infield was flooded, as was the track itself (while a road racing event was going on). The facility also experienced flooding in October 2005. In June 2009, the Lenox Industrial Tools 301 NASCAR Cup Series race was ended early by a storm which caused flooding at various locations around the track, including the infield tunnel: however in that case the post-race activities were not interrupted.

Before the 2008 racing season, Speedway Motorsports purchased NHIS and other racing-related assets from the Bahre family for $340 million cash.  The name of the speedway changed to New Hampshire Motor Speedway.  One of the assets included in the sale was a 50% interest in North Wilkesboro Speedway. The other 50% was still owned by Bruton Smith, the CEO of Speedway Motorsports.

NHMS representatives made a heavy push to reintroduce open-wheel racing in the form of IndyCar Series to the track in the 2009 season. In 2011, the series returned to the track. However, the race failed to meet attendance expectations and controversial decisions made by race officials at the end of the race caused the race to be left off the 2012 schedule.

After the 2012 Sylvania 300, Bruton Smith stated he wants to install permanent lighting at the speedway, just like the other SMI ovals. However, Bob Bahre signed a legal agreement with the town of Loudon and several neighbors when the track opened that nighttime races were prohibited. The agreement is binding on the current owners. In an October 2012 poll in Loudon, however, 58% of those who responded said they did not mind a night race. This poll also included plans to build a casino at the track, if approved by the New Hampshire Legislature.

In 2018, the fall race weekend, consisting of the Monster Energy NASCAR Cup Series and Camping World Truck Series, was moved to the Las Vegas Motor Speedway. It was replaced with what they called Full Throttle Weekend. With NASCAR local and International series stopping by, races included the NASCAR Whelen Modified Tour with the Musket 250, NASCAR K&N Pro Series East with the Apple Barrel 125 and NASCAR Pinty's Series Visit New Hampshire 100.

For the 2019 Musket 250 it was announced that Whelen Engineering Company will sponsor the Musket 250 now being called Musket 250 presented by Whelen.

Track mascot 
In 2009, the track introduced its first mascot, Milo the Moose. He wears a fire suit with the Speedway Motorsports logo and the track's name around it and is often seen wearing an open-faced helmet with a dark visor. He is seen on race weekends shaking hands with the drivers during driver introductions and hanging out with fans.

Track length of paved oval 
The track length is disputed by the two major series that run at New Hampshire.

Dirt track 
In 2018 New Hampshire Motor Speedway announced the construction of a quarter-mile dirt oval track behind the New England Motorsports Hall of Fame and the southern entrance to the Speedway. It was to be for the American Flat Track racing on Laconia Motorcycle Week 2019. It hosted the USAC Dirt Midget Granite State Legends Cars race on Friday of NASCAR weekend in July 2019, with NASCAR drivers Corey LaJoie and Daniel Hemric participating. In 2020 Snocross came to the track for an event in February.

NASCAR statistics

Current NASCAR events 

 NASCAR Cup Series – Crayon 301
 NASCAR Xfinity Series – Crayon 200
 NASCAR Whelen Modified Tour – Whelen 100

NASCAR records 
 NASCAR Cup Series Qualifying: Brad Keselowski, 27.090 s (140.598 mph), September 20, 2014
 NASCAR Cup Series Race: Jeff Burton, 2 h 42 min 35 s (117.134 mph), July 13, 1997
 NASCAR Xfinity Series Qualifying: Kyle Busch, 28.873 s (131.916 mph), July 13, 2013
 NASCAR Xfinity Series Race: Kyle Busch, 1 h 53 min 26 s (111.928 mph), June 27, 2009
 NASCAR Camping World Truck Series Qualifying: Austin Dillon, 28.574 s (133.296 mph), September 26, 2015
 NASCAR Camping World Truck Series Race: Kyle Busch, 1 h 33 min 35 s (109.780 mph), September 24, 2011
 NASCAR Camping World East Series Qualifying: Ben Rhodes, 29.622 s (127.414 mph), October 7, 2014
 NASCAR Camping World East Series Race: Ted Christopher, 1 h 13 min 9 s (108.476 mph), December 5, 2001
 NASCAR Whelen Modified Tour Qualifying: Mike Ewanitsko, 28.693 s (132.743 mph), July 19, 2001
 NASCAR Whelen Modified Tour Race: Todd Szegedy, 51 min 11 s (123.087 mph), July 16, 2011
 NASCAR Pinty's Series Qualifying: Kevin Lacroix, 31.040 s (122.706 mph), September 20, 2019
 NASCAR Pinty's Series Race: Kevin Lacroix, 57 min 8 s (111.109 mph), September 22, 2018
 NASCAR Sportsman Division Qualifying: T. W. Taylor, 33.740 s (112.887 mph), February 9, 1990
 NASCAR Sportsman Division Race: Dennis Setzer, 1 h 33 min 5 s (85.250 mph), February 9, 1990

NASCAR Cup Series records 
(As of 2/12/23)

* from minimum 10 starts.

Open-wheel race winners 
New Hampshire Indy 225

Other racing series 
Bryar Motorsports Park hosted Round 3 of the inaugural Trans-Am Series season in 1966. The race was held over 250 mi and was won outright by Canadian-born Australian Allan Moffat in an under 2.0 liter Lotus Cortina. The speedway hosted a round of the 2012 Global RallyCross Championship, and it hosts the annual Northeast Classic which includes American Canadian Tour and Pro All Stars Series races. It has both mini oval and road course Legends car races, as well as the NASCAR Advance Auto Parts Weekly Series, Bandolero racing, and other local series races.

Since 2011, the track has also hosted a race for the amateur 24 Hours of Lemons race series. The Loudon Annoying was a spring event held in 2011 and 2012, and the fall Halloween Hooptiefest has taken place since 2012.

Lap Records
The all-time outright track record is 21.466 seconds, set by Andre Ribeiro in a Reynard 95I, during qualifying for the 1995 New England 200. The fastest official lap records at New Hampshire Motor Speedway are listed as:

References

External links 

New Hampshire Motor Speedway official site

New Hampshire Motor Speedway Page on NASCAR.com
Trackpedia guide for drivers including telemetry sessions at the track (road course only)

Champ Car circuits
Buildings and structures in Merrimack County, New Hampshire
NASCAR tracks
Motorsport venues in New Hampshire
IndyCar Series tracks
NASCAR races at New Hampshire Motor Speedway
IMSA GT Championship circuits
1990 establishments in New Hampshire
Sports venues completed in 1990
Loudon, New Hampshire
Road courses in the United States